The St. Charles Air Line Bridge is a Strauss Trunnion bascule bridge which spans the Chicago River in Chicago, Illinois.

This bridge held the world record for longest bascule-type span until 1930, when it was shortened to  during a relocation as a result of straightening the river channel. The chief design engineer of the original bridge was Leonard O. Hopkins.

Photo gallery

See also
The adjacent B&OCT Bascule Bridge, with more information about the history of both bridges
List of bridges documented by the Historic American Engineering Record in Illinois

Further reading

External links

Historic Bridges of Michigan and Elsewhere

Bridges completed in 1919
Bascule bridges in the United States
Bridges in Chicago
Historic American Engineering Record in Chicago
Railroad bridges in Illinois
Canadian National Railway bridges in the United States
Chicago Landmarks